was a Japanese light novel magazine published by ASCII Media Works (formerly MediaWorks). The magazine succeeded the light novel magazine Dengeki hp, and originally was published as a special edition issue of Dengeki Daioh for the first two issues; the first issue was released on December 10, 2007. Dengeki Bunko Magazine became an independent magazine with the publication of its third volume on April 10, 2008. The magazine publishes information pertaining to ASCII Media Works' light novel publishing label Dengeki Bunko, along with short stories written by already established authors who have had previous light novels published under Dengeki Bunko. Other information pertains to adaptations from the light novels, such as video games, anime, or manga. The magazine ended on April 9, 2020.

Serialized stories
Accel World
Adachi and Shimamura
Ballad of a Shinigami: Unknown Stars
C³
Kino's Journey: the Beautiful World
Lillia and Treize Spin-off: Seron no Yume
Shakugan no Shana
Spice and Wolf
Sword Art Online
Toaru Majutsu no Index SS
Toradora!
Toradora Spin-off!

References

External links
Dengeki Bunko Magazine's official website 

2007 establishments in Japan
ASCII Media Works magazines

Light novel magazines
Magazines established in 2007
MediaWorks magazines